Michael Lee Dabich (born December 27, 1942 in Lander, Wyoming) is a retired American professional basketball center who played one season in the American Basketball Association (ABA) with the Oakland Oaks and the Dallas Chaparrals during the 1967–68 season. He played college basketball for New Mexico State University. He was drafted during the seventh round of the 1966 NBA draft by the New York Knicks, but did not play for them.

References

External links
 

1954 births
Living people
Akron Goodyear Wingfoots players
American men's basketball players
Basketball players from Wyoming
Centers (basketball)
Dallas Chaparrals players
Junior college men's basketball players in the United States
New Mexico State Aggies men's basketball players
New York Knicks draft picks
Oakland Oaks players
People from Lander, Wyoming